Alberto Ongarato (born 24 July 1975 in Padua) is an Italian road racing cyclist, who rode most recently for .

Professional career
Ongarato signed his first professional contract in 1998 for Ballan-Alessio. For them he finished third in the Rund um den Henniger Turm in 1999. A year later in 2001 he would place 115th. His next team De Nardi brought him his first professional win as he won the first stage of the Clásica Internacional de Alcobendas. He won stage 9 of the Volta a Portugal (2004) and in 2005 he won the second stage of the Tour de Luxembourg as well as the fifth stage of the Tour de Wallonie. In that year he took part in two giant tours, finishing 99th in the Giro d'Italia and 78th in his Vuelta a España debut. He did however take part in the 2006 Giro d'Italia (130th), 2006 Vuelta a España (131st) and 2007 Giro d'Italia (withdrew after stage 9). He also made his Tour de France debut in 2007.

Major results

2002
 1st, Stage 1, Clásica Internacional de Alcobendas
2004
 1st, Stage 9, Volta a Portugal
2005
 1st, Stage 2, Tour de Luxembourg
 1st, Stage 5, Tour de Wallonie
2010
 1st, Ronde van Drenthe

External links
 
 

1975 births
Living people
Sportspeople from Padua
Italian male cyclists
Cyclists from the Province of Padua
21st-century Italian people